The Complete Idiot may refer to:

 The Complete Idiot (1939 film), a Spanish comedy film
 The Complete Idiot (1970 film), a Spanish comedy film